The csakan (or czakan) is a type of woodwind instrument that was popular in Vienna in the early 19th century.

A type of duct flute, the csakan was originally crafted in the shape of a walking stick with a mouthpiece in the handle, reflecting the design of similar shepherds' flutes from Hungary, Slovakia and Croatia. From the 1820s, a new design appeared, which was in the shape of an oboe.

According to concert announcements from 1810, Anton Heberle was the inventor of the instrument. He was also the first to perform publicly on it, at a concert in Pest on 18 February 1807. Later that year, he also published the first music for the instrument, Scala für den Ungarischen Csakan. After the appearance of this Scala, around 400 more works for the csakan were published, including solos, duets, and pieces with piano or guitar accompaniment.

The czakan is a transposing instrument in A-flat. Modern manufacturers refer to it as "the Romantic recorder".

References

Fipple flutes